Najim is an Arabic given name and a surname meaning "star". It may refer to:

People

Given name 
Najim (singer), Algerian singer
Najim Arshad (born 1986), Indian playback singer and music director
Najim Haddouchi (born 1997), Dutch footballer of Moroccan descent 
Najim Haidary (born 1999), Afghan footballer
Najim Abdullah al-Jubouri, Iraqi Major General and governor
Najim Laachraoui (1991–2016), also known as Abū Idrīs al-Baljīkī or Soufiane Kayal, was a Belgian-Moroccan Islamic militant loyal to the Islamic State and was one of two suicide bombers at the Brussels Airport in the 2016 Brussels bombings
Najim al-Radwan (born 1972), Saudi Arabian weightlifter
Najim Abdallah Zahwen Al Ujayli, Iraqi general

Middle name
 Daham Najim Bashir (born 1979), Qatari athlete
 Mohanad Najim Aleqabi (born 1979), Iraqi journalist

Surname
Abderahim Najim (born 1954), Moroccan Olympic boxer
Ali Najim (born 1989), Kuwaiti radio personality
Daham Najim Bashir (born 1979), runner now representing Qatar after switching from Kenya
Haidar Najim (born 1967), Iraqi footballer
M. M. M. Najim or Mohamed Mujithaba Mohamed Najim, a Vice Chancellor of the South Eastern University of Sri Lanka
Mohammed Najim, Iraqi footballer
Samir Abdul Aziz al-Najim (born c. 1937), Iraqi politician, government minister and ambassador

See also
Najim Jihad, housing compound outside Jalalabad, Afghanistan related to Osama bin Laden
Najm
Njeim
Najima (disambiguation)

References

Arabic masculine given names
Arabic-language surnames